The RCAF Overseas Headquarters Band was a Royal Canadian Air Force military ensemble. It performed primarily in the United Kingdom during the Second World War as part of RCAF Overseas. It was founded in 1942, two years after the establishment of the headquarters. Its arrival in England was followed by that of the No. 6 Bomber Group Band and the Bournemouth Band. For most of its existence, it was led by Squadron Leader Martin Boundy. Boundy would later become the President of the Canadian Band Association in 1951 and 1970.

During its existence, it performed 55 concerts on the BBC and has also recorded for HMV as well as the Overseas Recorded Broadcasting Service. Notable performances have included one in front of Buckingham Palace in 1944 and a six-week European tour following the Victory in Europe Day. Two days after Canada Day in 1945, Boundy conducted a massed band from the band and the No. 3 Squadron Band in London's Lincoln's Inn Fields.

The Streamliners
The Streamliners was the band's 15-piece small dance band. It performed at the BBC as well as alternated with the United States Army Air Corps Band led by Glenn Miller and The Squadronaires of the Royal Air Force at the Queensbury Club (now the Prince Edward Theatre) in London. It is often referred to as "The Band of Brothers". In June 1944, the band was temporarily stationed in France to provide musical support to the allied troops participating in Normandy landings. In late 1945, it underwent a tour of Germany. The band members played at more than 
600 gigs throughout the 
UK, France, Belgium, the Netherlands, Germany, and Denmark. In its travels, the band used a special use Dakota C3 aircraft. It was notably led by Patrick Riccio. It also included British citizens such as Jack Fallon, who was an accomplished violinist.

See also
United States Air Forces in Europe Band
Band of the Duke of Edinburgh's Royal Regiment
Australian Army Band Corps

References

Bands of the Royal Canadian Air Force
Musical groups established in 1942
Military units and formations established in 1942
Military bands located outside their country of origin
1942 establishments in Canada